Heteromorpha is a genus of plants within the family Apiaceae. Its species are native to southern and tropical Africa and the southwestern Arabian Peninsula.

Species
, Plants of the World Online accepted the following species:
Heteromorpha arborescens (Spreng.) Cham. & Schltdl.
Heteromorpha gossweileri (C.Norman) C.Norman
Heteromorpha involucrata Conrath
Heteromorpha montana (P.J.D.Winter) J.E.Burrows
Heteromorpha occidentalis P.J.D.Winter
Heteromorpha papillosa C.C.Towns.
Heteromorpha pubescens Burtt Davy
Heteromorpha stenophylla Welw. ex Schinz

References

Apioideae
Apioideae genera